Njan Sthree (Malayalam, meaning I Am a Woman) is a popular Indian Malayalam language reality television  competition broadcast on Media One TV and sponsored by Malabar Gold and Diamonds.

Season summary

2013
Fifteen contestants participated from various states around the Malaysia. The top prize was awarded to Vani, the second prize to Jenni and the third prize to Shruthi. The top prize winner, Vani, received a memento and cash prize of Rs.10 Lakhs. She announced that she would form a group with all the contestants, and that the prize money would be used to provide basic amenities to four neglected schools.

References

Mass media in Kerala